Buccinastrum deforme, common name the collared buccinum, is a species of sea snail, a marine gastropod mollusk in the family Buccinanopsidae, the Nassa mud snails or dog whelks and the like.

Description
The size of the shell varies between 23 mm and 70 mm.

The ovate shell is smooth and ventricose. The spire is formed of six slightly convex whorls. The body whorl is very large and slightly canaliculated. The coloring is of a deep violet and oftentimes of a yellowish ash color, with a small white band which borders the base of each whorl of the spire. There exists also at the base of the shell, a large band of a grayish white color. Upon some specimens longitudinal whitish lines are seen, which are the vestiges of the several additions to the shell. The aperture is large and ovular. The columella is strongly arched, and upon all its length is seen a callosity of a yellowish color. The outer lip is of a reddish brown internally.

This shell is very different from other species in its form, which is globular, and its color, of a deep violet. In some specimens the spire is more elongated, and sometimes, within the shell, where it is of a paler violet, are delineated deeper bands. One only exists upon the upper whorls, and two broader upon the lowest.

Distribution
This marine species occurs from Uruguay to Argentina

References

 Cernohorsky W. O. (1984). Systematics of the family Nassariidae (Mollusca: Gastropoda). Bulletin of the Auckland Institute and Museum 14: 1–356.

External links
 
 King, P. P. (1832). Description of the Cirrhipeda, Conchifera and Mollusca, in a collection formed by the officers of H.M.S. Adventure and Beagle employed between the years 1826 and 1830 in surveying the southern coasts of South America, including the Straits of Magalhaens and the coast of Tierra del Fuego. 1832; for the date and authorship of this work. Zoological Journal, see Coan, Petit & Zelaya, 2011, The Nautilus. 5(125): 332-349
 Deshayes, G. P. & Milne-Edwards, H. (1844). Histoire naturelle des animaux sans vertèbres, présentant les caractères généraux et particuliers de ces animaux, leur distribution, leurs classes, leurs familles, leurs genres, et la citation des principales espèces qui s'y rapportent, par J. B. P. A. de Lamarck. Deuxième édition, Tome dixième. Histoire des Mollusques. J. B. Baillière: Paris. 638 pp.
 Kiener L.C. (1834-1841). Spécies général et iconographie des coquilles vivantes. Vol. 9. Famille des Purpurifères. Deuxième partie. Genres Colombelle, (Columbella), Lamarck, pp. 1-63, pl. 1-16 
 Strebel, H. (1906). Beiträge zur Kenntnis der Molluskenfauna der Magalhaen-Provinz. No. 4. Zoologische Jahrbücher, Abteilung für Systematik, Geographie und Biologie der Tiere. 24: 91-174, pls 7-13.
 Pastorino, G. & Simone, L.R.L. (2021). Revision of the genus Buccinanops (Mollusca: Neogastropoda: Nassariidae), an endemic group of gastropods from the Southwestern Atlantic, including a new genus and accounts on the Buccinanopsinae classification. Journal of Zoological Systematics and Evolutionary Research. 59(6): 1209-1254.

Buccinanopsidae 
Gastropods described in 1832